The Robert J. Frankel Stakes is a Grade III American Thoroughbred horse race for fillies and mares age three and older run over a distance of one and one-eighth miles (9 furlongs) on the turf track held annually in late December at Santa Anita Park in Arcadia, California, USA. The event currently offers a purse of $100,000.

History

The inaugural running of the event was on 4 January 1968 as the San Gorgonio Handicap, a sprint over the Downhill turf course over a distance of about six and one-half furlongs for horses that were four-years-old or older. The event was won by Tumble Weed who was trained by US Hall of Fame trainer Charles E. Whittingham in a time of 1:13. 

The event was named after a landmarks in Southern California, known as San Gorgonio Pass, San Gorgonio Mountain. a mountain in the San Bernardino Mountains and the former town of San Gorgonio now called Beaumont.

The following year the event was scheduled as a claiming stakes event held over a distance of  miles and was called the San Gorgonio Claiming Stakes. In 1970 the event was not held.

In 1976 Santa Anita Track Administration changed the conditions of the event to a handicap for four-year-old fillies and mares and  changing the name of the event back to San Gorgonio Handicap. The winner was the seven-year-old Chilean-bred mare Tizna who carried a record weight of 132 lbs to victory by a nose as the 9/5 favorite. 

In 1977 the event was run twice. Once in January and the second time in December when track administration scheduled the event earlier for the 1977–1978 Racing season. Hence, the event was not held in 1978 when the scheduled back in its January time slot. 

In 1983 the American Graded Stakes Committee classified the event as Grade III and upgraded the race in 1985 to Grade II. 

The event was renamed in 2010 to honor the late Hall of Fame trainer Robert J. Frankel who had trained eight winners of the event.

In 2012 the event was downgraded back to Grade III. 

The 2016 Robert J. Frankel Stakes lost its Grade III classification when, for safety reasons, the race was switched from the turf course to the dirt track.

In 2021 the event was scheduled to be held on the last day of the year but due to wet conditions Santa Anita administration moved the event to New Year's Day. Hence the conditions of the event were for four-year-olds and over.

Records
Time record:
 miles: 1:46.40 – Castilla (1983), Invited Guest (1990)

Margins:
 15 lengths – Miss Magnetic (1980)

Most wins by a jockey:
 5 – Laffit Pincay Jr. (1971, 1973, 1978, 1987, 1994)
 5 – Chris McCarron (1983, 1991, 1992, 1998, 2002)
 5 – Corey Nakatani (1993, 1996, 1996, 1997, 2016)

Most wins by a trainer:
 8 – Robert J. Frankel (1973, 1996, 1997, 1999, 2001, 2003, 2004, 2007)

Most wins by an owner:
 2 – Sidney Craig (1992, 1998)
 2 – Juddmonte Farms (1996, 2003)
 2 – 3 Plus U Stable (1997, 2001)
 2 – Stronach Stables (1994, 2007)
 2 – Abbondanza Racing (2016, 2017)

Winners

Legend:

 
 

Notes:

§ Ran as an entry

See also
List of American and Canadian Graded races

External links
 2021 Santa Anita Media Guide

References

Graded stakes races in the United States
Grade 3 stakes races in the United States
Mile category horse races for fillies and mares
Horse races in California
Recurring sporting events established in 1968
1968 establishments in California
Turf races in the United States
Santa Anita Park